Fachi is an oasis surrounded by the Ténéré desert and the dunes of the Erg of Bilma in eastern Niger, placed on the western edge of the small Agram mountain outcropping. It has an estimated population of 2,000 people. It is also a stopping point of the Agadez to the Kaouar caravans of the Azalay. Apart from water, dates, and salt, Fachi produces no provisions, and depends entirely upon trade in these products with passing caravans.

Frequently raided by Tuareg and other Bedouins in its past, the town is built within high fortifications, known locally as a ksar, built from banco salt blocks; they are now unused.

Fachi's population is largely from the Kanuri and Toubou peoples, in whose language the town is called Agram. Fachi, its official name, is from Tuareg and Hausa peoples, who at one time lived there in larger numbers.

References

Samuel Decalo. Historical Dictionary of Niger.  Scarecrow Press, London and New Jersey (1979). 
 Jolijn Geels. Niger. Bradt London and Globe Pequot New York (2006). .

Communes of Niger
Sahara
Oases of Niger
Agadez Region